Dexter Gabriel (born 1971), better known by his pen name Phenderson Djèlí Clark, is an American speculative fiction writer and historian, who is an Assistant Professor in the Department of History at the University of Connecticut. He uses a pen name to differentiate his literary work from his academic work, and has also published under the name A. Phenderson Clark. His pen name "Djèlí", makes reference to the griots – traditional Western African storytellers, historians and poets.

In 2022, his fantasy novel A Master of Djinn won the Nebula and Locus Awards. He has also won awards for his short fiction, including the Nebula, Locus and British Fantasy Awards for the novella Ring Shout in 2021.

Life and career
Dexter Gabriel was born in New York City in 1971, but spent most of his early years living in his parents' original home of Trinidad and Tobago. At age eight, he returned to the US and lived in Staten Island and Brooklyn before moving to Houston, Texas, when he was 12. Gabriel went to college at Texas State University-San Marcos, earning a B.A. and then an M.A. in history. He then earned a doctorate in history from Stony Brook University. Gabriel is currently Assistant Professor in the Department of History at the University of Connecticut.

In 2011, Gabriel began publishing short stories variously as P. Djèlí Clark, Djèlí A. Clark, Phenderson Djèlí Clark, and A. Phenderson Clark. Phenderson was his grandfather's name, while Clark was his mother's maiden name; Djèlí refers to West African storytellers, known in French as griots. He chose to use a pen name in order to separate his academic and literary work. In 2016, Clark sold his first major work, a novelette titled "A Dead Djinn in Cairo", to Tor.com. Since then, he has published novellas, short stories, and a novel. Four of his works – "A Dead Djinn in Cairo", "The Angel of Khan el-Khalili", The Haunting of Tram Car 015 and A Master of Djinn – are set in the same world, an alternate-universe Egypt. They are collectively titled the Ministry of Alchemy series or the Dead Djinn Universe.

Literary recognition

Novels

Novellas

Short stories

Partial bibliography

Dead Djinn Universe 

"A Dead Djinn in Cairo" (novelette), Tor.com, 2016.
"The Angel of Khan el-Khalili" (short story), Clockwork Cairo: Steampunk Tales of Egypt, ed. Matthew Bright, Twopenny Books, 2017.
The Haunting of Tram Car 015 (novella), Tor.com, 2019.
A Master of Djinn (novel), Tordotcom, 2021.

Other works

"The Secret Lives of the Nine Negro Teeth of George Washington" (short story), Fireside Fiction, 2018
The Black God's Drums (novella), Tor.com, 2018.
Ring Shout (novella), Tordotcom, 2020.
 "If the Martians Have Magic" (short story), Uncanny Magazine, 2021.

Notes

References

External links

Official site
Faculty page at the University of Connecticut
A Dead Djinn in Cairo at Tor.com

University of Connecticut faculty
Living people
Nebula Award winners
21st-century American historians
American science fiction writers
Black speculative fiction authors
1971 births
American people of Trinidad and Tobago descent
Texas State University alumni
Stony Brook University alumni
21st-century American male writers
American male non-fiction writers
Writers from New York City
Historians from New York (state)
21st-century pseudonymous writers
21st-century American novelists
American fantasy writers
21st-century American short story writers